The 1899 Lehigh football team was an American football team that represented Lehigh University as an independent during the 1899 college football season. In its second and final season under head coach Samuel Huston Thompson, the team compiled a 2–9 record and was outscored by a total of 144 to 60.

Schedule

References

Lehigh
Lehigh Mountain Hawks football seasons
Lehigh football